The 2005 Royal London Watches Grand Prix was a professional ranking snooker tournament that took place between 8 and 16 October 2005 at the Guild Hall in Preston, England.

John Higgins won in the final 9–2 against Ronnie O'Sullivan. In the final, Higgins set two records: His century breaks in the seventh, eighth, ninth and tenth frames marked the first time a player had ever recorded centuries in four consecutive frames in a match during a ranking tournament. He scored 494 points without reply, the greatest number in any professional snooker tournament, until Ding Junhui made 495 points without reply against Stephen Hendry in the league stage of the 2007 Premier League.

Prize fund
The breakdown of prize money for this year is shown below: 

Winner: £60,000
Runner-up: £30,000
Semi-final: £15,000
Quarter-final: £11,000
Last 16: £7,000
Last 32: £5,000
Last 64: £3,000

Highest break: £4,000
Maximum break: £20,000

Total: £400,000

Main draw

Final

Qualifying

Qualifying for the tournament took place between 27 and 28 September 2005 at Pontin's in Prestatyn, Wales. All matches were best of 9 frames.

Century breaks

Qualifying stage centuries
 136  Patrick Wallace
 136  Dominic Dale
 130, 118  Ding Junhui
 125  Stuart Bingham
 122  Andrew Norman
 121  Jamie Burnett
 114  Matthew Couch
 113  Chris Norbury

Televised stage centuries

 145, 141, 123  Barry Hawkins
 140  Mark King
 139, 127, 120  Shaun Murphy
 138, 132, 128, 126, 104, 103, 102  John Higgins
 135  Bjorn Haneveer
 134  Anthony Hamilton
 129, 115, 111, 107  Stephen Hendry
 128, 117, 113, 100  Ronnie O'Sullivan
 123  Mark Williams

 122  Neil Robertson
 118, 116  Gerard Greene
 118, 105  Jimmy White
 117  Chris Norbury
 113, 101, 100  Stuart Bingham
 106  Andy Hicks
 106  Fergal O'Brien
 102  Stephen Maguire

References 

2005
Grand Prix
Grand Prix (snooker)
Grand Prix (snooker)